Yevheniia Breus is a Ukrainian wheelchair fencer. She represented Ukraine at the 2016 Summer Paralympics held in Rio de Janeiro, Brazil and she won the bronze medal in the women's épée A event. She also won the bronze medal in the women's sabre A event at the 2020 Summer Paralympics held in Tokyo, Japan.

References

External links 
 

Living people
Year of birth missing (living people)
Place of birth missing (living people)
Ukrainian female sabre fencers
Ukrainian female épée fencers
Wheelchair fencers at the 2016 Summer Paralympics
Wheelchair fencers at the 2020 Summer Paralympics
Medalists at the 2016 Summer Paralympics
Medalists at the 2020 Summer Paralympics
Paralympic bronze medalists for Ukraine
Paralympic medalists in wheelchair fencing
Paralympic wheelchair fencers of Ukraine
20th-century Ukrainian women
21st-century Ukrainian women